The Margalla Avenue or Margalla Expressway (Urdu: مارگلہ ایکسپریس وے) is a partially-operational under-construction six-lane highway of 33 kilometers in the Margalla Hills area in the suburbs of Islamabad. It was planned in 1966 but was stalled till 2021. The expressway/avenue is an alternative to Srinagar Highway and would provide easy access to the tenth and eleventh sectors of Islamabad to N-5 National Highway. This road is a crucial section of the larger Rawalpindi Ring Road project as it connects the town of Sangjani (N-5 National Highway) to the town of Barakahu (Murree Expressway).

Prime Minister of Pakistan, Imran Khan has laid the foundation stone of the project on March 20th, 2022. Chief MInister Punjab, Sardar Usman Buzdar, Federal Interior Minister, Sheikh Rasheed Ahmed and other notables were also present during foundation stone lying ceremony of the project.

History
The project was planned in 2006 during Pervez Musharraf regime as an alternative to Srinagar Highway and future new Islamabad Airport. The project remained pending until it regained importance during Yousaf Raza Gillani government due to the new Islamabad International Airport. The project was finally started in 2012 with the cost of Rs. 744 million, with the completion deadline of June 2013. However, the project stalled since the Capital Development Authority (Islamabad) (CDA) could not acquire land for the project for various reasons; for example, a century-old graveyard at Shah Allah Ditta village came on the road, and locals of the village protested against it.  In 2014, CDA announced an alternative plane to divert the road from the northern part of Shah Allah Dita instead of its south. Reportedly 40% of the work was completed by 2014. However, the 2.4 K.m. patch passing through Shah Allah Ditta graveyard hung in the balance as the village's residence refused to vacate it. 
However, till 2019 only 51% of the project was completed due to conflicts between contractor and CDA.  The contractor pleaded that land clearance was the responsibility of CDA, while CDA maintained the contract was canceled before this due to some technical reasons. The court ruled in favor of the contractor and fined Rs. 170 million to CDA, which was challenged in the Islamabad Highcourt. In January 2020, CDA formed a committee to resolve the out of court settlement of outstanding with the contractor and find some viable solution to restart the project. Prime Minister of Pakistan Imran Khan performs groundbreaking of the project on April 19, 2021.

Significance of the Project 
According to CDA officials, the road would shed load from the existing Srinagar Highway. It would connect existing Khayaban-i-Iqbal to Murree Road via Bari Imam. Most importantly, Phase II of Islamabad on the west of N-5 National Highway or G.T. road would connect to Islamabad's existing sectors. The highway would also provide alternative access to M1 motorway, Islamabad International Airport, and Rawalpindi Ring Road.  
In 2015, CDA announced that once Margalla Avenue is completed, it would be linked to E75 expressway. In early 2020, Rawalpindi Development Authority (RDA) announced the final shape of Rs. 62 billion Rawalpindi Ring Road project. The project was approved by Chief Minister, Punjab  Sardar Usman Buzdar in September 2020. The Rawalpindi Ring Road project would end at the Sangjani Toll plaza, and this would provide a direct connection to all parts of Rawalpindi. The road would also connect 60 kilometers Islamabad Ring Road project. CDA announced its tenth avenue project, which would link Kashmir Highway and Margalla avenue and all sectors in between. The Rs. 3725 million projects would complete in three years. Another important related project called New Blue Area spanning 170 Kannals was inaugurated near Sector F-9 Park with Rs. 30 billion by Prime Minister Imran Khan in an effort to distribute commercial center between future extensions of Islamabad and existing city. Margalla avenue is significant to the project to connect this new commercial center to the western bank phase II of the city, the auction of this started in July, 2020.

See also 
 Jinnah Avenue
 Developments in Islamabad

References

External links 
 Capital Development Authority
 Islamabad Administration

Highways in Islamabad Capital Territory
Highways in Punjab